was one of twelve s, built for the Imperial Japanese Navy (IJN) during the 1920s. During the Pacific War, she participated in the Philippines Campaign in December 1941 and the Dutch East Indies Campaign in early 1942. In March, she was assigned to convoy escort duties in and around Malaya and the Dutch East Indies until she was transferred to Rabaul in early 1943 to ferry troops around New Guinea and the Solomon Islands.

Design and description
The Mutsuki class was an improved version of the s and was the first with triple  torpedo tubes. They were powered by two Parsons geared steam turbines, each driving one propeller shaft, using steam provided by four Kampon water-tube boilers. Their crew consisted of 150 officers and crewmen.

The main armament of the Mutsuki-class ships consisted of four  Type 3 guns in single mounts; one gun forward of the superstructure, one between the two funnels and the last pair back to back atop the aft superstructure. The guns were numbered '1' to '4' from front to rear. The ships carried two above-water triple sets of 61-centimeter torpedo tubes; one mount was between the forward superstructure and the forward gun and the other was between the aft funnel and aft superstructure. Four reload torpedoes were provided for the tubes. They carried 18 depth charges and could also carry 16 mines. They could also be fitted with minesweeping gear.

Minazuki was one of six Mutsuki-class ships reconstructed in 1935–36, with their hulls strengthened, raked caps fitted to the funnels and shields to the torpedo mounts. In 1941–42, most of those ships were converted into fast transports with No. 2 and No. 3 guns removed. In addition, ten license-built  Type 96 light AA guns and at least two  Type 93 anti-aircraft machineguns were installed. The minesweeping gear was replaced by four depth charge throwers and the ships now carried a total of 36 depth charges. Three more 25 mm guns were added in 1942–43.

Construction and career
Minazuki laid down by the Uraga Dock Company at its shipyard in Uraga on 24 March 1924, launched on 25 May 1926 and completed on 22 March 1927. Originally commissioned simply as Destroyer No. 28, the ship was assigned the name Minazuki on 1 August 1928.

Pacific War
At the time of the attack on Pearl Harbor on 7 December 1941, Minazuki was assigned to Destroyer Division 22 under Destroyer Squadron 5 of the 3rd Fleet. She sortied from the Mako Guard District in the Pescadores as part of the Japanese invasion force for Operation M (the invasion of the Philippines), during which time the destroyer helped screen landings of Japanese forces at Lingayen Gulf and at Aparri.

In early 1942, Minazuki was assigned to escorting troop convoys from French Indochina for Operation E (the invasion of Malaya) and Operation J (the invasion of Java, Netherlands East Indies), in February. From 10 March 1942 Minazuki was reassigned to the Southwest Area Fleet and escorted troop convoys from Singapore around the occupied Netherlands East Indies. She returned to Sasebo Naval Arsenal for repairs on 18 August, and rejoined the fleet on 4 October, continuing escort duties.

Minazuki was assigned to the 8th Fleet at Rabaul on 25 February 1943, and for the remainder of the year was deployed on numerous "Tokyo Express" troop transport missions throughout the Solomons Islands. She landed troops during the Battle of Kolombangara (12 July), but did not see combat, and suffered minor damage from an air attack near Shortlands, which provided an excuse to withdraw to Kure Naval Arsenal from August through September for repairs. By 13 September, Minazuki was back at Rabaul, and from 28 September was evacuating Japanese troops from Kolombangara. During a second run on 2 October, Minazuki engaged three US destroyers, and was hit by three shells, all of which were duds. Damage caused by a near miss in an air raid temporary disabled her No. 1 and No. 2 guns on 12 October, but Minazuki continued to make "Tokyo Express" runs to Buka and Kavieng, New Ireland through the end of the year. On 4 November, Minazuki rescued 267 survivors of the damaged transport Kiyozumi Maru.

After repairs at the end of the year, Minazuki resumed "Tokyo Express" transport missions to Rabaul to the end of February, and was assigned patrols based out of Palau in March and April. From 1 May, Minazuki was reassigned to the Central Pacific Area Fleet. She escorted troop convoys from Yokosuka to Saipan in May.

The destroyer  rescued 45 survivors, but Minazukis captain, Lieutenant Kieji Isobe, was not among them. The ship was struck from the Navy List on 10 August 1944.

Notes

References

External links
Mutsuki-class destroyers on Materials of the Imperial Japanese Navy

Mutsuki-class destroyers
Ships built by Uraga Dock Company
1926 ships
World War II destroyers of Japan
Ships sunk by American submarines
Shipwrecks in the Celebes Sea
World War II shipwrecks in the Pacific Ocean
Maritime incidents in June 1944